Vergara River is a river located in the Intermediate Depression of Chile. The river rises at the junction of the Malleco and Rehue rivers, close to the city of Angol.Nahuelbuta Range barrier forces the river to flow northward. At the latitude of the town of Renaico, the Vergara is joined by its main affluent, the Renaico. From its confluence with the latter river to its confluence with the Liñeco Creek, the Vergara River marks the boundary between the regions of Bío Bío and La Araucanía.

The town of Nacimiento lies near the confluence with the Biobío River.

See also
List of rivers of Chile

References

Rivers of Biobío Region
Rivers of Araucanía Region
Rivers of Chile